Raymond Stuart McCrea (born 1945) is a former Northern Ireland politician with the Democratic Unionist Party.

McCrea was elected to Belfast City Council in 1977 and sat on the body until 1985, serving as leader of the DUP council group in 1981. He was elected to the Northern Ireland Assembly at the 1982 election to represent South Belfast, serving as a member of the Environment, Health and Social Services committees. At the 1983 general election McCrea was DUP candidate for South Belfast although he finished in third place.

References

1945 births
Living people
Democratic Unionist Party councillors
Members of Belfast City Council
Northern Ireland MPAs 1982–1986